Wickliffe Kitchell (May 21, 1789 – January 2, 1869) was an American politician and lawyer.

Born in New Jersey, Kitchell moved to southern Indiana in 1814. While clearing his land, Kitchell badly injured his foot causing him to be lame for the rest of his life. He studied law and was admitted to the Indiana bar in 1817. While living in Indiana, Kitchell was appointed sheriff. In 1817, Kitchell moved to Palestine, Crawford County, Illinois Territory. From 1820 to 1822, Kitchell served in the Illinois House of Representatives and then served in the Illinois State Senate from 1828 to 1832. He also served as state attorney. In 1838, Kitchell moved to Hillsboro, Montgomery County, Illinois. In 1839, Kitchell was appointed Illinois Attorney General and served until 1840, when he resigned to serve another term in the Illinois House of Representatives. Kitchell was a Democrat and then became a member of the Republican Party after the Kansas-Nebraska Act was passed. From 1846 to 1854, Kitchell lived in Fort Madison, Iowa. He then moved back to Hillsboro, Illinois in 1854. Kitchell died in Pana, Illinois in 1869.

Notes

1789 births
1869 deaths
People from New Jersey
People from Palestine, Illinois
People from Hillsboro, Illinois
People from Indiana
People from Fort Madison, Iowa
Indiana sheriffs
Indiana lawyers
Illinois lawyers
Illinois Democrats
Illinois Republicans
Illinois Attorneys General
Members of the Illinois House of Representatives
Illinois state senators
19th-century American politicians
19th-century American lawyers